Manuel Francisco Barreto Sayán (Born September 12, 1982 in Lima, Peru) is a Peruvian football coach and former player who played as a striker. He is the current manager of Universitario's youth categories.

Barreto began his professional career at the age of 16 with Universitario de Deportes in 1998. Barreto's debut in the Peruvian First Division was against Lawn Tennis Fútbol Club, where he managed to score one of the four goals scored by Universitario that game. He had a short spell at APOEL on 2007, in which he won the Cypriot Championship.

Honours

Club
 Universitario de Deportes
 Peruvian First Division 1998

 APOEL
 Cypriot First Division: 2006-07

References

External links

1982 births
Living people
Footballers from Lima
Association football forwards
Peruvian footballers
Peruvian expatriate footballers
Club Universitario de Deportes footballers
Coronel Bolognesi footballers
APOEL FC players
Club Deportivo Universidad de San Martín de Porres players
José Gálvez FBC footballers
Juan Aurich footballers
Cypriot First Division players
Expatriate footballers in Cyprus
Peruvian football managers
Sporting Cristal managers
Club Universitario de Deportes managers